Ceraunus (Céran) (died 614) was the Bishop of Paris. His relics are in the church of St. Genevieve, Paris; they are on the altar of St Clotilda. He is also said to have been bishop 609 to 622.

He is a Catholic and Orthodox saint, his feast day is 27 September.

Notes

614 deaths
Bishops of Paris
7th-century Christian saints
Year of birth unknown